Goold Brown (March 7, 1791 – March 31, 1857) was an American grammarian.

Biography

Goold Brown was born in Providence, Rhode Island  on March 7, 1791, the third child of Smith Brown and Lydia Gould. His family could be traced to some of the earliest Quakers in New England.

He was educated in Friends' Schools in Providence and Dutchess County, New York. He began teaching at age 19, and at 21 he opened an academy for classical and literary studies in New York City.

He died in Lynn, Massachusetts on March 31, 1857.

Bibliography

 Institutes of English Grammar, in 1823
 First Lines of English Grammar, in 1823
 The Grammar of English Grammars, in  1851

References

External links
 Goold Brown
 
 
 

1791 births
1857 deaths
American non-fiction writers